George Washington Lightfoot (born 1889 in Denver, Colorado – died 1941 in Mercer Island, Washington) was a Mercer Island business owner known campaigning for more than 12 years to build what was then known as the Lake Washington Floating Bridge connecting the island to Seattle across Lake Washington. George Lightfoot, commonly known as "Speed", and his brother, Ewart Gladstone Lightfoot, commonly known as "Hap", ran Lightfoot Enterprises on Mercer Island from 1914 through the early 1980s. Lightfoot Enterprises included the first grocery store, post office, gas station, dance/movie hall and bakery on Mercer Island. George Lightfoot was also a talented vaudeville musician who performed under the stage name "The Jolly Hobo Globetrotter" along with his sister, Eva, known as "The Mandolin Banjo Fiend".

References

 
 Hilliard, N. (2008). Mercer Island Old and New - Redux. 

1889 births
1942 deaths
People from Mercer Island, Washington